We Will Follow: A Tribute to U2 is a U2 tribute album recorded by various artists in May 1998.  It was first released on July 13, 1999, and was re-released in 2006.

Track listing 
We Will Follow covers material from nine U2 albums: Boy, October, War, The Unforgettable Fire, The Joshua Tree, Rattle and Hum, Achtung Baby, Zooropa, and Pop.

References

U2 tribute albums
1999 compilation albums